The Chabukiani is a Georgian family name from the Lechkhumi region in north-western Georgia.

The Chabukiani family name comes from these towns of Lechkhumi: Alpana, Agvi, Bardnala, Dekhviri, Lasuriashi, Laskhana, Latsoria, Lajana, Lesindi, Lukhvano, Makhashi, Nakuraleshi, Nasperi, Orbeli, Okhureshi, Kulbaki, Gvirishi, Chkhuteli, Tsageri and Dsilamieri.

Notable members 
 Vakhtang Chabukiani

References 

Georgian-language surnames